Av. Larco (also known as Av. Larco, la película) is a 2017 Peruvian musical comedy-drama film directed by Jorge Carmona. It is based on Av. Larco: El musical by Rasec Barragán & Giovanni Ciccia, which in turn is inspired by the song «Avenida Larco» by the Peruvian rock group "Frágil".

Synopsis 
Four school friends form a music band with which they dream of being famous. They are from the upper class and play rock, a genre that at the end of the 1980s was in full swing due to the Peruvian social conflicts and the rise of the  terrorism in the country. Astalculo, the band, participates in a contest whose final prize is to play in a great concert in the Plaza de Acho, but first they must play in popular stages that will make them see the reality of the country in which they live. The competition will force them to get out of their privileged bubble, see the other side of the city and face the problems of their country in conflict. Peruvian rock hymns will accompany them on this journey to adulthood, in which they will live romances and adventures, and music will be the best antidote to not lose hope.

Cast 

 Juan Carlos Rey de Castro as Andrés Dulude
 André Silva as Pedro
 Nicolas Galindo as Javier
 Carolina Cano as Marite
 Daniela Camaiora as Lola
 María Grazia Gamarra as Susana
 Mayra Goñi as Rebeca
 Andres Salas
 Javier Valdés as father of Andrés
 Katia Condos as Andrés's mother
 Emanuel Soriano as Rebeca's brother
 Carlos Galiano

Special Participations 

 Bruno Odar
 Erika Villalobos

Awards

Production 
The film is shot in seven weeks in various locations in the city of Lima. It premiered on Thursday, March 30, 2017, and two weeks later it exceeded half a million viewers.

Soundtrack 
Various artists from the Peruvian rock scene participated in cameos for the songs, such as Andrés Dulude and Tavo Castillo from Frágil, Daniel F from Leusemia, Manolo Barrios from Mar de Copas, Marcello Motta from Amen, Julio Pérez from La Sarita, among others.

Songs list 
The songs that appear in the film are the following:

 «Al colegio no voy más» (Leusemia)
 «La universidad» (Rio)
 «Mayoría equivocada» (Autopsia)
 «Sucio policía» (Narcosis)
 «Avenida Larco» (Frágil)
 «Contéstame» (Rio)
 «Y es que sucede así» (Arena Hash)
 «Lo peor de todo» (Rio)
 «Decir adiós» (Amén)
 «Triciclo Perú» (Los Mojarras)
 «Demolición» (Los Saicos, Leusemia)
 «Suna» (Mar de Copas)
 «Más poder» (La Sarita)
 «Nostalgia provinciana» (Los Mojarras)
 «Lola» (Miki González)
 «Las torres» (Nosequien y Los Nosecuantos)
 «Astalculo» (Leuzemia)
 «Inmortales» (Cementerio Club)
 «Magdalena» (Nosequién y Los Nosecuántos)
 «Por tu amor» (Autocontrol)
 «Mujer noche» (Mar de Copas) (unreleased video)

References

External links 

 

2017 films
2017 musical films
2017 comedy-drama films
2017 LGBT-related films
Peruvian musical films
Peruvian comedy-drama films
Peruvian LGBT-related films
Tondero Producciones films
2010s musical comedy films
2010s Peruvian films
2010s Spanish-language films
Films set in Peru
Films shot in Peru
Films about terrorism
Films about racism
Films about musical groups
Films about music and musicians
Films based on musicals
Films based on songs